Mystara is a campaign setting for the Dungeons & Dragons fantasy role playing game. It was the default setting for the "Basic" version of the game throughout the 1980s and 1990s. Most adventures published for the "Basic" edition of D&D take place in "The Known World", a central continent that includes a varied patchwork of both human and non-human realms. The human realms are based on various real-world historical cultures. In addition, unlike other D&D settings, Mystara had ascended immortal beings instead of gods.

The Mystara planet also has sub-settings. The older Blackmoor setting was retconned to exist in Mystara's distant past. The Hollow World refers to the inner surface contained within the world of Mystara, similar to the real world legends of the Hollow Earth, while some adventures take place on the Savage Coast, a 2,000 mile long frontier coastline about 2,000 miles to the west of the Known World.

By the mid-1990s, gamers' attention started to shift towards the second edition of Advanced Dungeons & Dragons and its official campaigns. Some Mystara adventures for AD&D were published between 1994 and 1996. Eventually, official support of the Mystara setting was transitioned to the Official Fan Site system wherein the Vaults of Pandius fansite was selected to become the official site for the future 3rd edition of Mystara, and Wizards of the Coast support was discontinued by the time the game's third edition was released in 2000.

Development
Mystara originated as a fantasy world developed by Lawrence Schick and Tom Moldvay for their own Dungeons & Dragons game sessions from 1974 to 1976. Their original setting consisted of a large continent with fictionalized nations that were based on real-world historical cultures. Inspired by author H. P. Lovecraft and his work in creating a fiction shared universe, Schick and Moldvay named their setting as the "Known World" so it could be expanded upon by other players. Schick then went to work at TSR Hobbies as a designer for D&D and other games. After being promoted to director of the Design Department he brought Moldvay in to join the company as a game designer, around the time when the D&D Expert Set was under development. After being told that they could not use the existing Greyhawk setting, as it was being reserved for only Advanced Dungeons & Dragons products, Schick and Moldvay got approval to instead use their "Known World" as the standard D&D campaign setting.

Schick and Moldvay's "Known World" was used as a semi-generic setting in early adventure modules, first mentioned in Module X1, The Isle of Dread. It was then expanded upon in various D&D modules and sources, particularly a series of Gazetteers, many of which originally referred to the setting as "The D&D Game World". The first published use of the name "Mystara" came in 1991 from Bruce Heard in the Letters section of his Voyage of the Princess Ark series in Dragon magazine. While the name was used in official publications after this, it wasn't until the conversion to AD&D 2nd Edition in 1994 that products were produced under the Mystara title with the official Mystara logo.

Each part of the D&D Gazetteer series treats one nation or empire, and has three basic elements: cultural and geographic background, features, and adventures. The cultural and geographic campaign background section offers a brief history and timeline for each nation; basic geography, climate, and ecology; and, fundamental social and political concepts of the region. Each Gazetteer also offers a list of scenario ideas appropriate to the campaign setting.

Trenton Webb for the British Arcane RPG magazine described Mystara as "a traditional Tolkienesque world".

Planet of Mystara 
Mystara's outer surface consists of three principal land masses: the continent of Brun, the continent of Skothar, and the continent of Davania, plus the island continent of Alphatia (up to AC 1010). In the officially published material, the Known World concentrated on the eastern portion of Brun along with the lands of the Sea of Dawn. The continents of Mystara resemble those of Earth approximately 135 million years ago.

The inhabitants of Mystara are diverse: humans of all races can be found here, along with myriad creatures such as elves, dwarves, halflings, orcs, and dragons.

Some of the notable nations of Mystara include the Thyatian Empire, the Grand Duchy of Karameikos, the Principalities of Glantri,  the merchant-run Republic of Darokin, the Emirates of Ylaruam, the Dwarven nation of Rockhome, the Elven Kingdom of Alfheim, Halfling lands of the Five Shires and the chaotic Alphatian Empire.

The continent of Brun 
The most commonly known land mass on Mystara's outer surface is actually a tiny portion of the continent of Brun itself. In the officially published material, the Known World concentrated on the eastern portion of Brun along with the islands of the Sea of Dawn.

The Known World 
The Known World has cultures and a level of technological development that resemble Europe around the 15th century, but without gunpowder. Nations of the known world display a great range of government types. Some nations are populated entirely by demihumans and/or humanoids. By common convention, the boundaries of the "Known World" are those covered in the world map as originally published in the module X1, The Isle of Dread, plus Norwold, the Isle of Dawn, and (pre Wrath of the Immortals) Alphatia.

As the name implies, the "Known World" covers the most notable nations of Mystara, the ones most commonly used in Mystara-based campaigns and featured in fiction. It includes the Thyatian Empire, which could be compared to Byzantine Empire; the Grand Duchy of Karameikos (which includes the town of Threshold, the default setting of many classic D&D adventures), comparable to medieval southeastern Europe; the Principalities of Glantri, which is similar to medieval western Europe, ruled by wizard-princes; the Ethengar Khanate, a Mongol-like society; the merchant-run Republic of Darokin, which is based somewhat loosely on the mercantile states of Medieval Italy; the Emirates of Ylaruam which have an Arabic flavor; the Heldannic Territories,  ruled by an order of religious Knights devoted to the Immortal Vanya, similar to the Teutonic Knights; the Atruaghin Clans, which have an Amerindian feel; the nation of Sind, based on India during the rule of the Mughals; the Northern Reaches Kingdoms of Ostland, Vestland, the Soderfjord Jarldoms, based on Scandinavian kingdoms at various periods of history; the Dwarven nation of Rockhome; the elven Kingdom of Alfheim; the Halfling lands of the Five Shires; and the Alphatian Empire, ruled by wizards and other spellcasters.

To the distant Northwest of the "Known World", across the Great Waste, lies the mysterious lands of Hule, ruled by Hosadus, also known as "The Master". Also on the periphery of the Known World are the Kingdoms of Wendar and Denagoth, the first an elven-dominated nation and the latter a mountainous and dark realm of evil, with ill-intentions towards Wendar. The Adri Varma lies between Sind, Wendar, the Great Waste, and The Black Mountains, forming the northern border of Glantri and defining the northwestern limits of the region.

The Savage Coast 

Mystara includes the Savage Coast, a coastal area located in the south central part of the Brun continent, to the south and west of Hule. The area is a 2,000 mile long frontier coastline about 2,000 miles to the west of the Known World.

This part of Mystara is affected by the Red Curse, a sinister enchantment which eventually kills its inhabitants through mutation unless the (fictional) metal cinnabryl is worn in contact with the body.  The specifics of the "Red Curse" include mutilation of the body and extreme degeneration of physical and mental health.  It also imprisons the inhabitants of the region, as debilitating effects result if they leave the cursed area.

Atmosphere
Savage Coast's swashbuckling flavor is very different from that of the "Known World", closer in atmosphere to that of the Age of Exploration than the fantasy middle-ages/renaissance tone of the Known World. The Savage Coast is complete with gunpowder ("Smokepowder") weaponry.

Publication history
The first published information on the area was the module X9 The Savage Coast for Dungeons & Dragons Expert Set. The region was later expanded in Dungeon magazine issues 6 and 7 (1987) with the adventure  "Tortles of the Purple Sage".

Two series in Dragon Magazine, "The Princess Ark" and the "Known World Grimoire", described the Savage Coast in more detail. These articles were partially reprinted in the D&D game accessory Champions of Mystara (1993).

The Savage Coast In 1994 was spun off into a campaign setting for Advanced Dungeons & Dragons (2nd Edition).  This area was published in its own boxed set entitled Red Steel, and later republished on-line as the Savage Coast.  An expansion, Savage Baronies, was released the next year. These supplements were for AD&D 2nd edition, as all the previous material had been for the "Classic" version of D&D.

In 1996 the setting was revised and re-released under the AD&D: Odyssey line as three fully online products available for free download. This range included the base Savage Coast Campaign Book by Tim Beach and Bruce Heard, a supplement Savage Coast: Orc's Head and a Monstrous Compendium Appendix.

The continent of Davania 
Even though most of the Known World civilizations historically originated from this part of the planet, it did not see much development while the Mystara product line was still in production. The only major appearance of the continent was in Dragon magazine, where parts of it were sketched out during the Voyage of the Princess Ark series, by Known World Product Manager Bruce Heard.

In recent years, many Mystara fans have been turning their attention to Davania with fan-made material.

The continent of Skothar 
Very little was officially developed for this part of Mystara. Ever since the Mystara product line was discontinued, fans have created their own material for this part of Mystara.

The Hollow World 

Mystara is a hollow planet, with a habitable surface on its interior called the Hollow World. This world is lit by an eternal red sun at the center of Mystara, and serves as a "cultural museum," preserving the societies that have become extinct in the outer world. The existence of the Hollow World is not, in general, known to the inhabitants of the outer world. The poles are actually huge, subtly curving holes that allow passage between the outer and inner world, although it is a long, hard trek through a cold, unlit, stormy and anti-magic area. The curvature of the holes is so subtle that explorers from either surface do not notice the transition until after it is already made, causing quite a shock for most.

Moons 
Two moons orbit the planet. Matera is a moon much like our own, whose phases govern lycanthropy (werewolves, werebears, etc.). Only the Immortals inhabit Matera. They live in a city, Pandius, where they can meet and watch over Mystara. Patera, or Myoshima to its inhabitants, is an invisible moon that cannot be seen from Mystara. Patera's inhabitants have a culture similar to that of medieval Japan.

Blackmoor 
Mystara (like Greyhawk) also incorporated the Blackmoor setting by placing it in the world's distant past. Blackmoor evolved from a feudal kingdom into a highly advanced civilization, using more and more powerful – and destructive — technology. It ended itself in an apocalyptic explosion so devastating that it changed the climate and geography of the entire planet.

Mystara video games 

Five video games were set in Mystara, and they span three different genres. Order of the Griffon (TurboGrafx 16, 1992) and Dungeons & Dragons: Warriors of the Eternal Sun (Sega Genesis, 1992) are role-playing video games. Fantasy Empires (PC, 1993) is a strategy game. The plots and development teams of these games are unrelated.

Dungeons & Dragons: Tower of Doom (1993) and its sequel Dungeons & Dragons: Shadow over Mystara (1996) are two arcade beat 'em up with minimal role-playing elements. These two games are among the few D&D video games developed by a Japanese company, in this case by Capcom.

Novels
 Dark Knight of Karameikos (October 1995), by Timothy Brown,
 The Black Vessel (August 1996), by Morris Simon,

First Quest
 Rogues to Riches (February 1995), by J. Robert King,
 Son of Dawn  (May 1995), by Dixie Lee McKeone,
 The Unicorn Hunt (1995), by Elaine Cunningham

Dragonlord Chronicles
 Dragonlord of Mystara  (July 1994), by Thorarinn Gunnarsson,
 Dragonking of Mystara (July 1995), by Thorarinn Gunnarsson,
 Dragonmage of Mystara (April 1996), by Thorarinn Gunnarsson,

Penhaligon Trilogy
 The Tainted Sword (October 1992), by D.J. Heinrich,
 The Dragon's Tomb (April 1993), by D.J. Heinrich,
 The Fall of Magic  (October 1993), by D.J. Heinrich,

Source material

Dungeons & Dragons BECMI rules

Notable adventure modules

Dungeons & Dragons Gazetteers

Dungeons & Dragons Trail Maps

Dungeons & Dragons Creature Crucible

Dungeons & Dragons Hollow World

Advanced Dungeons & Dragons Mystara

Advanced Dungeons & Dragons Red Steel

Advanced Dungeons & Dragons Odyssey: Savage Coast

Notes

References

External links
  Vaults of Pandius Website with most of the current fan based projects, to include conversions to other editions.
 Cyclopedia Mystara Mystara in more detail including genealogies, areas, known people, etc.
 The Savage Coast Campaign Book

 
Dungeons & Dragons campaign settings
Fantasy worlds
Fictional planets